The following table shows the European record progression in the men's 400 metres, as ratified by the EAA

Hand timing 

* Performance timed over 440 yards

Automatic timing

References 

400 m
European record men
European 400 metres record